Alma Mater Society may refer to:
Alma Mater Society of Queen's University
Alma Mater Society of the University of British Columbia

See also
Alma mater